The Masked Singer is a Dutch reality singing competition television series based on the Masked Singer franchise which originated from the South Korean version of the show King of Mask Singer. It premiered on RTL Nederland on 27 September 2019, and is hosted by Ruben Nicolai.

Series overview

Season 1

Contestants

Final Guesses

Episodes

Episode  1
Original airdate:

Episode  2
Original airdate:

Episode  3
Original airdate:

Episode  4
Original airdate:

Episode 5
Original airdate:

Episode  6 - Finale
Original airdate:

Season 2

Contestants

Final Guesses

Episodes

Episode  1
Original airdate:

Episode  2
Original airdate:

Episode 3
Original airdate:

Episode 4
Original airdate:

Episode 5
Original airdate:

Episode 6
Original airdate:

Episode 7
Original airdate:

Episode 8 - Finale
Original airdate:

Season 3

Contestants

Final Guesses

Episodes

Episode 1
Original airdate:

Episode 2
Original airdate:

Episode 3
Original airdate:

Episode 4
Original airdate: 

 Guest Performance: "Kiss" by Prince performed by Gert Verhulst & Viktor Verhulst as "Parrots."

Episode 5
Original airdate: 

 Guest Performance: "Mamma Mia" by ABBA performed by Jamie Westland & Frans van Zoest as "Monsters."

Episode 6 
Original airdate: 

 Guest Performance: "(I've Had) The Time of My Life" by Bill Medley & Jennifer Warnes performed by Manon Meijers & Guus Meeuwis as "Ice Cream & Cupcake."

Episode 7
Original airdate: 

 Guest Performance: "Kings & Queens" by Ava Max performed by Geraldine Kemper as "Pug."

Episode 8
Original airdate:

Episode 9
Original airdate:

Episode 10 - Finale
Original airdate:

Season 4

Contestants

Final Guesses

Episodes

Episode 1 
Original airdate:

Episode 2 
Original airdate:

Episode 3
Original airdate:

Episode 4
Original airdate: 

 Guest Performance: "All My Life" by K-Ci & Jojo performed by Ronald de Boer & Demi de Boer as "Dragons."

Episode 5
Original airdate: 

 Guest Performance: "Sunshine" by OneRepublic performed by Winston Gerschtanowitz & Renate Verbaan as "Robots."

Episode 6
Original airdate: 

 Guest Performance: "Physical" by Olivia Newton-John performed by Patty Brard as "Cake."

Episode 7
Original airdate: 

 Guest Performance: "When You're Gone" by Bryan Adams performed by Olcay Gulsen & Ruud de Wild as "Star & Saturn."

Episode 8
Original airdate:

Episode 9 - Finale
Original airdate:

New Year's Special (2020/2021)
 Group performance: "The Final Countdown" by Europe

New Year's Special (2021/2022)
 Group performance: "Disco Inferno" by The Trammps
 Group performance: "Hangover" by Taio Cruz feat. Flo Rida

New Year's Special (2022/2023)

Ratings

Season 1

Season 2

Season 3

Season 4 

 Indicates a new viewer record at the time.

References

External links
 

2019 Dutch television series debuts
2010s Dutch television series
Dutch-language television shows
Dutch television series based on South Korean television series
Masked Singer
RTL 4 original programming